Rhododendron serpyllifolium (ウンゼンツツジ) is a rhododendron species native to Honshu, Kyushu, and Shikoku, Japan. It is a shrub that grows to 120 cm. (4 ft.) in height. Flowers are white to pink.

Synonyms 
 Azalea serpyllifolia A.Gray

References 
 Ann. Mus. Bot. Lugduno-Batavi 2:165. 1866
 JSTOR, A.Gray specimen
 Hirsutum
 
 
 
 

serpyllifolium
Taxa named by Friedrich Anton Wilhelm Miquel